Alain Terrane (17 July 1923 - 28 February 2000) was a French actor.

Filmography 

1948 : Man to Men by Christian-Jaque
1949 : Branquignol by Robert Dhéry
1949 : Le Grand Cirque by Georges Péclet
1949 : La Patronne by Robert Dhéry
1950 : Casabianca by Georges Péclet : a sailor
1951 : Fortuné de Marseille by Henry Lepage and Pierre Méré
1952 : Les Révoltés du Danaé by Georges Péclet
1953 : Julietta by Marc Allégret
1953 : Tabor de Georges Péclet
1953 : Thérèse Raquin by Marcel Carné : a lory driver

External links 
 

French male actors
1923 births
2000 deaths